Hindsight bias is the inclination to see past events as being predictable and reasonable.

Hindsight may also refer to:

Film and television
 "Hindsight", an episode of the ninth season of ER
 "Hindsight", a season 16 episode of Law & Order
 Hindsight (TV series), a 2015 VH1 series
 Hindsight (2011 film), a South Korean action drama film
 Hindsight (2008 film), an American thriller film

Literature
 Hindsight, a 1983 novel by Peter Dickinson
 "Hindsight", a 1940 science fiction story by Jack Williamson
Hindsight (comics), a fictional character from the Marvel Comics universe
Hindsight (book), a 2018 memoir by Justin Timberlake

Music
 Hindsight (Emmure album), 2020
 Hindsight (Anathema album), 2008
 Hindsight (John Reuben album), 2002
 Hindsight (Ken McIntyre album), 1974

 "Hindsight", a song by Death Cab for Cutie from their 1997 album You Can Play These Songs with Chords
 "Hindsight", a song by Built to Spill from their 2009 album There Is No Enemy
 "Hindsight", a song by Pillar from their 2002 album Fireproof
 "Hindsight", a song by Until June from the 2008 album Until June
 "Hindsight", a song by The Long Winters from the 2006 album Putting the Days to Bed

 Hindsight Record Company, a record company based on original recordings from the Big Band era by Wally Heider

Other
 Captain Hindsight, a fictional character that appears in the South Park episodes Coon 2: Hindsight and Mysterion Rises
 Retrocognition, the psychic ability to see into the past
 Project Hindsight, a 1960s US Defense Department study into the utility of research

See also
 Hindsight optimization
 Hindsight 20/20 (album), an album by The Arrogant Worms
 Hindsight 21/20: Anthology 1975–1995, an album by Guy Clark
 Hinesight, a 2004 album by Marcia Hines